Normandie Stud was a successful British breeder of thoroughbred racehorses owned by Philippa Cooper. They bred Group 1 winners Fallen For You, Duncan and Sultanina.

References

Racehorse owners and breeders